Grande Balmaz is a mountain of Savoie and Haute-Savoie, France. It lies in the Aravis Range and has an elevation of 2,616 metres above sea level.

Mountains of the Alps
Mountains of Savoie
Mountains of Haute-Savoie